The Cheshmeh Kileh River is located in the northern part of Iran. It flows into the Caspian Sea at Tonekabon city.

Its headwaters comprise two forested valleys, Do-Hezar ("Two Rivers") valley and Se-Hezar ("Three Rivers") valley, both on the northern slopes of the Alborz mountain range.

Central Alborz mountain range map

See also

References
 

Rivers of Mazandaran Province
Tributaries of the Caspian Sea